Rawalpindi features a humid subtropical climate (Köppen: Cwa) with  hot summers, and cool to cold winters. Its climate is classified as very similar to its twin city Islamabad, but the geographical location and extreme urbanization of Rawalpindi has led to weather and climatic conditions that are notably different from its twin. Rawalpindi's weather has historically been known to change rather quickly due to its proximity to Himalayas and the Pir Panjal Range. These mountains not only influence the weather of the city, but also provide great recreation during the hot months. Furthermore, Its warm comfortable mean annual temperature of  attracts people to live here permanently from all over Pakistan. However, frontal cloud bands also bring significant rainfall in the winter. In summers, June is the hottest with record maximum temperature at a blistering  recorded on 13 June 1953. On the other hand, January is the coldest month of the year when temperature can drop to a minimum  in the winter recorded on 17 January 1967. Throughout the year, Rawalpindi and Islamabad experience an average of about 98 thunderstorms, which is the highest frequency of thunderstorms in Punjab province of any plane station. In fact, most rainfall in the city is accompanied by a thunderstorm with peak activity experienced in August. Record rainfall was experienced in the year 2013 at a massive  mostly due to an unusually wet monsoon season. On a typical day, the city hosts breezy afternoons (+), but usually calm to light breeze (Beaufort scale) wind conditions are observed after midnight. Moreover, just a few kilometers southwest of Rawalpindi, the potential power generation has been identified by U.S. Aid to be between marginal to good ( to ) at 50 m height.

Prevailing conditions
Western Disturbance, Monsoon and localized convection currents during the summers are responsible for changing weather conditions in Rawalpindi. Following is a list and conditions provided for the change in weather conditions.

 Western Disturbances occur almost every month in the city, but peaks during the winter months.  Not only do these disturbances decrease day and night temperatures, but provides the city with rainfall during its dry months.  However, by the time these winds reach Rawalpindi, these westerly waves are quite weak in intensity resulting in only light to moderate amounts of rainfall.  Heavy rainfall from these disturbances are rare. Nonetheless, February 2013 experienced record rains accumulating to 
 Monsoon result in the greatest amount of rainfall in the city and reduces the excruciating heat of the relatively dry early summer months. During late June, July, August, and early September with every out easterly winds with the intensity of fresh breeze bring along the monsoon clouds and push them against the mighty Himalayas. Most often, significant rainfall in Rawalpindi doesn't occur until these moisture laden air interact with western disturbances, producing powerful supercell thunderstorms accompanied with heavy winds, lightning and heavy to very heavy rainfall. Furthermore, these storms can last from 20 minutes to several hours in duration. The highest dew point is experienced during this time of the year with extremely high heat indices.
 Dust storms occur most frequently during the dry heat of May and June, but may well also be occur during the months of late March and April. Dust storms in Rawalpindi are most often accompanied by thunderstorms producing squalls and lightning. Visibilities drop below 100 meters in extreme cases with wind speeds surpass a fierce . Rainfall from these storms is generally low to moderate.
 Continental Air prevails during the dry periods of the year with ample sunshine and partly cloudy to clear skies. As high pressure is established atmosphere becomes stable result in no precipitation until a western disturbance intervenes. Strong breeze from westerly direction blow during the day, while nights are calm during this time.

Thunderstorms
Rawalpindi experiences one of the greatest number of thunderstorms in Pakistan. At a frequency of 89.45 thunderstorms per year on average, which is quite high, these numbers are comparable to those of Florida, USA. Some of the strongest thunderstorms in the country occur here either accompanied by dusty squalls, microbursts, cloudburst and sometimes even funnel clouds. Its location allows it to experience the maximum wind speed of the storm relative to its twin city Islamabad. On 13 October 2006, wind gusts from a powerful thunderstorm reported by Pakistan Meteorological Department to have reached . As a matter of fact, a funnel cloud was also observed during this storm near Chaklala, Rawalpindi. Tornadoes are rare, but have been reported thrice in the past decade in 2006 and 2012, 2014. The biggest challenge that arises due to these dangerous conditions include fallen trees, downed power lines, and damage to infrastructure including mud houses in the slums and billboards around the city.

Monthly conditions

Every month in Rawalpindi is marked by its own unique characteristics, conditions and weather pattern. Following is also a summary of each month's averages and records.

January
Most days are clear blue skies, however this month is prone to foggy nights and mornings. Near zero visibility is experienced during extremely foggy nights that absolutely hampers air traffic and motorways. Western Disturbance brings cloudy days, rain and sometimes thunderstorms, which are essential for breaking long dry spells in the city experienced during this cool month. Moreover, it eliminates the conditions suitable for the formation of fog at night. However, strong thunder/windstorm is uncommon during this month. Strong winds blow from the west during most clear days, but nights are calm with cool to cold temperatures.

February
February experiences similar weather to January except that usually it is a few degrees warmer. Overcast for several days is not uncommon during this month with the least amount of sunshine experienced during this month. A record high of  recorded on 28 February 1985, while the coldest  on 8 February 1978 have been recorded. Moreover, hailstorms with thunderstorms are not a rare occurrence in this cool time of the year. Observations demonstrate that cold weather (below zero temperature) is not experienced after halfway through the month as plantation season officially begins during the last fortnight.

March
A freak heat wave was experienced in Rawalpindi with maximum temperature reaching on 20 March 2010, breaking the old record of  recorded exactly on the same day in 2002. Hailstorms are both greater in frequency and intensity during March and weather can quickly change during the day.

April
April in Rawalpindi transitions from warm to hot during day time, while night temperatures begin to move from cool to warm. Typically, late April sees a sharp rise in both the day and night time temperatures. Western Disturbance is responsible for localized rainfall during this month, but typically these systems are not as strong as during March since rainfall totals . Moreover, thunderstorms often cause horrid dust storms that become a frequent occurrence as the weather becomes drier, transitioning into summer. An average 1.0 dust storms are experienced in Rawalpindi (Average 1961-1991). One such thunderstorm was blamed for the disaster of Bhoja Air jet, flight BHO-213 when a lightning strike or wind shear was blamed for the tragedy. A full report has yet to be released to the public. Heavy rain showers are rare during this month as dust storms frequently only cause drizzle or light scattered rain that makes the weather pleasant.

May
As May begins day time temperatures begin to rise and the day and night time temperature range is high during this time. It is categorized as a hot dry month with a record maximum of  experienced on 31 May 1988. Nevertheless, night time temperatures during heat waves could remain well above average with the warmest low of  recorded in 2013. Mid-May and June typically are the dry heat season. These storms truly testify as "Kali Andhi", a common phrase used by the locals as they witness an average of 1.6 dust storms per year (average 1961-1991). Most storms occur during night time that brings relief from the relentless heat of the day.

June
June is undoubtedly the hottest month of the year. Most day time temperatures are excruciatingly hot with the maximum record temperature of  recorded on 23 June 2005 in Chaklala, Rawalpindi with an average high reaching . June experiences the highest number of dust storms averaging 2.4 (average of 1961-1991). Thunderstorm activity is high and the city often experiences severe thunderstorms during this month. Rainfall for June averages  and comes from both western disturbances, localized thunderstorms and monsoons. Record breaking wind speed for June was recorded on 5 June 2003 when a wind/thunderstorm broke havoc in the city with gusts up to 90 knots  that caused most of the city to lose power and property damage. These powerful thunderstorms develop as a result of moist warm monsoon winds colliding with cool dry western disturbance creating monstrous thunderstorms accompanied with powerful microburst that cause extensive damage to billboards, pylons, roofs, crops and trees. Unfortunately, every year these wind storms kill as well. One such microburst of 85 knots was recorded by a weather station at Chaklala on 12 June 2012. Usually, late June welcomes the monsoon season which causes dew point to rise, and wind direction shifts from west to southeast.

July
The highest rainfall ever recorded in a month accumulated to  recorded in 1995 with very dramatic weather as rain was brought by severe thunderstorms and cloudburst. The average high temperature for July is  categorized as hot, an extreme of  recorded on 3 July 2012. Nights are also warm at an average  since the temperature range is small during these humid months. Thunderstorm activity is the second highest during this month but most of the rumbling and anger of the clouds is heard at night. Rain showers can be extremely heavy at times especially during cloudburst events. Unprecedented flooding cannot be ruled out during such events. One such cloud burst took the twin cities by surprise also known as the 2001 Islamabad cloud burst, brought historic flash floods in the stream of "Nullah Lai" and brought tragic scenes to the city. This 100-year storm dropped Pakistan's highest 24-hour rainfall ever reported in the neighboring city of Islamabad accumulating to an astounding , while Rawalpindi at Shamasabad (Northern Rawalpindi) received  during the same storm, while Chaklala, Rawalpindi recorded .

August
August is a hot and humid month, however, thunderstorm activity reaches its peak primarily due to the monsoon. On average a thunderstorm happens every other day also attributing it as the wettest month of the year. Similarly to July, some of the strongest thunderstorms are formed during this month that result in severe wind storms. One such powerful thunderstorm was reported from Northerly direction on 26 August 2005, which not only caused most of the city to lose power, but motorists faced hazardous conditions due to falling trees. Record rainfall for the month is a massive  recorded in 2013. Furthermore, it is not unusual to experience + rain showers within 24 hours during July and August. Flooding in lower elevations of the city is common as well. The temperature by mid August becomes comfortable enough that plantation season begins in the city.

September
September is cooler and relatively less humid than the subsequent two monsoon months. It is referred as a post monsoon month, which usually entertains less moisture than the peak season. However, Western Disturbance interact more with the monsoons during this month resulting in strong thunderstorm activity and heavy wind and rain. Not only do the temperatures begin to decrease from August, but the drop in humidity makes the outdoors more comfortable. However, recent years have experienced a spike in post monsoon rainfall activity. In 2011, a total  was recorded, which was at that time a recent record . However, in 2014, this monthly rainfall record shattered completely by a low air pressure system that moved and stalled over the North East Punjab region causing cloud burst conditions in some areas between 3 and 5 September. At Chaklala, the 24 hour rainfall was recorded at an astounding , while Shamasabad weather station recorded . The total accumulation for the month was  setting a new record for 2014.

October
October is a warm and dry month with plenty of sunshine throughout the day. Humidity drops rapidly as the monsoons recede from the country and is replaced by westerly winds. Typically, wind speed increase around noon and usually dies down by night time. However, these winds are dry as western disturbance activity also drop significantly. Some of the lowest relative humidity values are experienced during this month. Temperature range is high during this month as nights begin to enter the cool temperature range with warm sunny days. The average low is a cool at  while a warm  is the average high. Record high for the month is hot  recorded on 1 October 2009. and a record low of  has been recorded on 31 October 1984. The previous record rainfall for the month was a shy  recorded in 1997. However, October is witnessing erratic rainfall patterns in recent years increasing its monthly average. One such example happened in 2015 between the 25th and 26th of the month when  of rain fell in just 24 hours on 25 October 2015. This 24 hour accumulation alone was 4 times higher than monthly average of the month. The record set for 2015 totalled an impressive .

November
November is a pleasant; however the driest month of the year as the mean rainfall is barely . Therefore, relative humidity during this month is also the lowest throughout the year. This month receives the greatest amount of sunshine hours as overcast days during both October and November are very rare. Moreover, November demonstrates a continuation of very similar weather pattern observed in October, but with significantly cooler day and night temperatures. A few thundershowers cool down the weather further and officially sets cold weather during this month. But more recently, not only has the month exhibited warmer temperatures during the day and night, it is also becoming even drier. Day temperature ;however, due to high temperature range, is still warm at an average of  Record low for this month  recorded on 28 November 1970, while the record high of  has been recorded on 2 November 1999.

December
December is the second coldest month in Rawalpindi after January with a record low temperature of  recorded on 25 December 1984. Typically on a sunny day temperature range during the last three months can be in excess of  that results in the comfortable outside temperature during day time. During the least active weather periods, lack of rainfall, low wind speeds and cool temperatures during the month results in foggy/smoggy conditions during early morning times. It is the second least windiest month of the year. It is not uncommon for people of all age groups to enjoy the afternoon and evening sun because of its irreplaceable warmth. Western Disturbances begin to affect the city more frequently, but strong thunderstorms are rarely experienced.

Heat island effect

Like most major cities of Pakistan, Rawalpindi not only lack vegetation, but experiences a phenomenon known as the Urban Heat Island. Urban Sprawl and lack of adequate vegetation has witnessed a rise in both day and especially night temperatures. Although some of the above normal temperatures can be attributed to climate change. However, in comparison to its green neighbour Islamabad, Rawalpindi can experience nights up to 2-5 °C warmer. During the recent years (after 2012), Rawalpindi on average is starting to experience warmer temperatures at an average of 1.5 degree Celsius. Not long ago (up until the late 1990s), Rawalpindi was merely 0.5 to maximum 1 degree Celsius warmer than its twin city, Islamabad. In 2015, during the month of May, Rawalpindi's night temperatures were on average 21.6 degrees Celsius, while Islamabad (only 8 kilometers north in a much vegetated area) recorded an average low of 18.1 degrees Celsius. To show the extremity of this phenomenon, on 8 May 2015, Islamabad experienced a minimum temperature of 18 degrees, while Rawalpindi recorded 25.5 degrees Celsius. This is the highest temperature difference experienced on a clear night between the two cities.

See also
 Climate of Islamabad
 2001 Islamabad cloud burst
 Climate of Pakistan
 List of extreme weather records in Pakistan

References

Rawalpindi
Rawalpindi District